Serges Flavier Mbilla Etame (22 June 1988), also known as Mbilla Etame, is a Cameroonian professional footballer who plays as a forward.

Club career
Etame joined Antalyaspor on a two-year contract on 7 July 2015. He scored his first Süper Lig goal with a header shot, in second match-day game against Gençlerbirliği that ended 3–1 for Antalyaspor, on 23 August 2015. He scored his second goal in the final minutes of the twelfth match-day game against Galatasaray and helped his team to win one point in the 3–3 draw on 21 November 2015. On 12 December 2015, he scored the first equalizer for Antalyaspor while they were 1–0 down against Mersin İdman Yurdu, which was his third league goal of the season. The game ended 3–2 in favour of Antalyaspor.

International career
Etame was named in Cameroon's squad for a friendly against France in May 2016.

Career statistics

Club

Achievements

Individual
TFF First League Top Scorer (1): 2010–11

References

External links
 
 

1988 births
Living people
Cameroonian footballers
Association football forwards
Union Douala players
Adanaspor footballers
Khazar Lankaran FK players
Samsunspor footballers
Antalyaspor footballers
Alanyaspor footballers
Ankaraspor footballers
TFF First League players
Azerbaijan Premier League players
Süper Lig players
Cameroonian expatriate footballers
Expatriate footballers in Turkey
Cameroonian expatriate sportspeople in Turkey
Expatriate footballers in Azerbaijan
Cameroonian expatriate sportspeople in Azerbaijan